Dean-Charles Chapman is an English actor known for portraying Billy Elliot in the West End theatre production of Billy Elliot the Musical, Tom Blake in Sam Mendes's film 1917, and Tommen Baratheon in the fourth, fifth and sixth seasons of the HBO drama series Game of Thrones. He also played Richard Grey in The White Queen.

Career 
At the age of eight, Chapman was cast as "Small Boy" in Billy Elliot the Musical, and would later be promoted to the roles of Michael and finally the titular character, becoming the second-longest running cast member in the production. During his time on Billy Elliot, he worked alongside future Spider-Man actor Tom Holland, and had the opportunity to meet Prime Minister Gordon Brown with several other young actors in the play.

Soon after leaving Billy Elliot, Chapman was cast on the CBBC sitcom The Revolting World of Stanley Brown in the lead role, alongside fellow future Game of Thrones and Blinded by the Light co-star Nell Williams. The show lasted for one season. He made his film debut in the 2014 film Before I Go to Sleep, alongside Nicole Kidman and Colin Firth.

After playing the minor role of Martyn Lannister in the third season of Game of Thrones, he replaced Callum Wharry in the major role of Tommen Baratheon, the young king of Westeros for the fourth, fifth, and sixth seasons of the show. With the rest of the cast, he was nominated for a Screen Actors Guild Award. In 2018, he played the role of Castor in the AMC series Into the Badlands for seven episodes, followed by a supporting role in the film Blinded by the Light.

In 2019, he was cast, alongside George MacKay, as one of the two leads in the Sam Mendes-directed war film 1917.  The film went on to receive ten Academy Award nominations, winning three. Subsequently, he played the lead role of Matthew in the Eoin Macken's drama Here Are the Young Men, supported by Finn Cole, Anya Taylor-Joy, and Ferdia Walsh-Peelo.

Personal life 
Chapman is close friends with his Game Of Thrones co-star Isaac Hempstead Wright, (Brandon Stark), whom he met through his involvement with the series.

Filmography

Film

Television

Stage

Awards and nominations

References

External links

 

1997 births
21st-century English male actors
English male film actors
English male television actors
English male stage actors
English male child actors
Living people
Male actors from Essex
People from Romford